Louise Lorraine (born Louise Escovar; October 1, 1904 – February 2, 1981) was an American actress.

Life and career
Louise Lorraine was born Louise Escovar in San Francisco, California. One day, a photography salesman knocked on the door of the Los Angeles home where Lorraine lived with her widowed mother and five siblings. The door was answered by Lorraine. The salesman was so taken aback by her looks and demeanor that he told her mother she should be in films, then silent films and he happened to have a contact with Ince Studio. Initially, Lorraine's mother refused, but eventually she gave in.

Lorraine began working in films as an extra and "a bathing girl" before she gained leading roles in comedies for independent studios. After that, she spent time at MGM and Universal. She became very popular in action-filled serials such as The Radio King and With Stanley in Africa in 1922.

She starred in 11 in all, showing much energy and charisma, not as much seen in many of her colleagues in that genre. Lorraine was selected one of the WAMPAS Baby Stars in 1922. She may be best-remembered for being the third actress to portray Jane, having portrayed the character in the 1921 movie serial The Adventures of Tarzan. She starred in only five talkies in her film career, including Near the Rainbow's End (1930), co-starring Bob Steele. Following this film, she retired from the film industry to devote her time with her husband and two children.

Personal life
She married three times Her first marriage to Joseph Bray in 1922 ended in divorce. Her second husband from 1926 to 1928 was actor Art Acord. Her third marriage to Chester J. Hubbard lasted from 1930 to 1963, his death. She had two children. She died in 1981, aged 76, in New York City, from undisclosed causes. She is interred at Forest Lawn - Hollywood Hills Cemetery.

Partial filmography

 Elmo the Fearless (1920)
 The Flaming Disc (1920)
 The Adventures of Tarzan (1921)
 The Fire Eater (1921)
 With Stanley in Africa (1922)
 Headin' West (1922)
 The Radio King (1922)
 The Altar Stairs (1922)
 The Gentleman from America (1923)
 The Oregon Trail (1923)
 McGuire of the Mounted (1923)
 A Midsummer Night's Scream (1923)
 The Great Circus Mystery (1925)
 Borrowed Finery (1925)
 The Wild Girl (1925)
 Three in Exile (1925)
 The Verdict (1925)
 The Silent Guardian (1925)
 Pals (1925)
 The Blue Streak (1926)
 Exit Smiling (1926)
 The Silent Flyer (1926)
 The Stolen Ranch (1926)
 Winners of the Wilderness (1927)
 Rookies (1927)
 Hard Fists (1927)
 The Frontiersman (1927)
 Legionnaires in Paris (1927)
 Baby Mine (1928)
 Circus Rookies (1928)
 A Final Reckoning (1928)
 The Wright Idea (1928)
 Chinatown Charlie (1928)
 Shadows of the Night (1928)
 The Diamond Master (1929)
 The Mounted Stranger (1930)
 Beyond the Law (1930)
 The Jade Box (1930)
 The Lightning Express (1930)
 Near the Rainbow's End (1930)
 Moonlight and Cactus (1932)

References

Further reading

External links

1904 births
1981 deaths
20th-century American actresses
American film actresses
American silent film actresses
Actresses from Los Angeles
Actresses from San Francisco
Burials at Forest Lawn Memorial Park (Hollywood Hills)
WAMPAS Baby Stars
Western (genre) film actresses